Velika Kruševica (Serbian Cyrillic: Велика Крушевица) is a village in Šumadija and Western Serbia (Šumadija), in the municipality of Rekovac (Region of Levač), lying at , at the elevation of 270 m. According to the 2002 census, the village had 289 citizens.

External links
 Levac Online
 Article about Velika Kruševica
 Pictures from Velika Kruševica

Populated places in Pomoravlje District
Šumadija